Phoenix was described as a pinnace in the service of the English Navy Royal. She has no record of service and was not mentioned after 1624.

Phoenix was the second named vessel since it was used for a 20-gun ship purchased in 1545, rebuilt in 1558 and sold in 1573.

Construction and specifications
She was built at Chatham Dockyard. She was ordered on June 1612 and launched on 27 February 1613. Her tonnage was between 184.8 and 246.4 tons.

Her gun armament was in 1624 18 guns consisting of twelve sakers, four minions, two falcons, plus four fowlers. Her manning was around 100 officers and men in 1603.

Commissioned service
She has no record of service.

Disposition
Phoenix was not mentioned after 1624.

Notes

Citations

References
 British Warships in the Age of Sail (1603 – 1714), by Rif Winfield, published by Seaforth Publishing, England © Rif Winfield 2009, EPUB , Chapter 4, The Fourth Rates - 'Small Ships', Vessels Acquired from 24 March 1603, Phoenix
 Ships of the Royal Navy, by J.J. Colledge, revised and updated by Lt-Cdr Ben Warlow and Steve Bush, published by Seaforth Publishing, Barnsley, Great Britain, © the estate of J.J. Colledge, Ben Warlow and Steve Bush 2020, EPUB , Section P (Phoenix)
 Lavery, The Arming and Fitting of English Ships of War 1600 - 1815, by Brian Lavery, published by US Naval Institute Press © Brian Lavery 1989, Part V Guns, Type of Guns

 

Ships of the Royal Navy
1600s ships